Khairpur Tehsil is an administrative subdivision (tehsil) of Khairpur District in the Sindh province of Pakistan, it is administratively subdivided into 24 Union Councils one of which form the capital, Khairpur.

Piryaloi town distance from 20 km Khairpur city.

References

Populated places in Khairpur District
Talukas of Sindh